Alupar is a Brazilian holding company dedicated to the segments of power generation and transmission. Among all companies in this segment, Alupar is one of the largest in terms of Annual Permitted Revenue and the largest privately held company.

History
In 2000 - Alupar started operating in transmission segment. In 2005, the company began operations in hydroelectric generation segment.

In 2005 - Began operations in hydroelectric generation segment.

In 2007 - Merger of all transmission and hydroelectric generation companies in the energy sector into the same holding company.

In 2013 - The company had an initial public offering estimated at BRL 740 million.

In 2021 - Alupar reported net income of BRL 1,115.4 million. Alupar has infrastructure projects related to the energy sector in Brazil and other countries in Latin America such as Colombia and Peru.

Shareholder structure
Alupar's shareholder structure consists of a 52% stake held by Guarupart and 48% held in the public market.

Transmission Assets
Alupar currently has 30 transmission systems, totalling 7,929 km of transmission lines.

ETEM
ECTE 
ETSE 
ETEP 
ESDE 
EATE 
ERTE 
ENTE 
EBTE 
STN
Transleste 
Transirapé
Transudeste
STC
Lumitrans
ETES
TME
ETVG
TNE
ELTE 
ETAP 
ETC
TPE
TCC
ESTE
TCE (Colombia)
TSM
ETB
EDTE
AETE

Generation Assets 
Alupar has diversified its electric power matrix by investing in activities of generation plants, such as Hydroelectric Power Plants (HPPs), Small Hydroelectric Power Plants (SHPPs) and Wind Farms.

HPP São José
HPP Foz do Rio Claro
HPP Ferreira Gomes 
HPP La Virgen 
SHPP Queluz
SHPP Lavrinhas
SHPP Morro Azul  
SHPP Verde 08
SHPP Antônio Dias 
Energia dos Ventos’ Wind Farm (Aracati Complex)
São João (wind)
Santa Régia (wind)
Pitombeira (solar)

References

External links 

 Website

Electric power companies of Brazil
Holding companies of Brazil
Hydroelectric power companies
Brazilian companies established in 2007
Energy companies established in 2007
Holding companies established in 2007